In some languages, resyllabification is a phenomenon where consonants become attached to vowels in a syllable different than the one from which they originally came. This can even occur across word boundaries, as happens in the enchaînment of contemporary French-language phonology.

Phonotactics